Supergator  is a 2007 horror film directed by Brian Clyde, produced by Roger Corman, and starring Brad Johnson and Kelly McGillis. The music was by Damon Ebner; it was a parody of the film King Kong.

Background
After Corman produced Dinocroc in 2004, he wanted to create a sequel to be named Dinocroc 2, but the Sci-Fi Channel turned down the project after claiming that sequels did not do well for them. Corman decided to go ahead with the project, but under the name Supergator.

Plot 
Professor Scott Kinney is an American geologist monitoring a local volcano when a Supergator, a Deinosuchus recreated from fossilized preserved DNA, escapes from a secret bio-engineering research center/laboratory. Along the way, it eats 13 people, including two lovers, three drunken teens, three models, two tourists and a fisherman. It also eats Alexandra Stevens and Ryan Houston.

Kinney joins forces with another scientist, Kim Taft, and a Texan alligator hunter named Jake. They pursue the monster as it heads down river intent on destroying a luxurious resort packed with hundreds of tourists. Conventional weapons have no effect on it at all and Kim is eaten. So they, with the help of Carla, plan a trap for it using a fake volcano. They lure him on to it, with Jake using himself as live bait. The Supergator devours him and Kinney kills it by shooting at the fake volcano, which then blows up the beast.

Cast 
 Brad Johnson as Professor Scott Kinney
 Kelly McGillis as Kim Taft
 Bianca Lawson as Carla Masters
 Mary Alexandra Stiefvater as Alexandra Stevens
 Josh Kelly as Ryan Houston
 John Colton as Jake Kilpatrick
 Holly Weber as Lorissa
 Tamara Witmer as Gigi
 Nic Nac as Jeremy
 Meg Cionni as Wendy
 Greg Cipes as Shaun
 Matt Clendenin as The Driver
 Gene DeFrancis as Lance
 Sarah DuBois as Betty
 Elizabeth J. Carlisle as Brenda
 Sol Kahn as Jason
 Ikaika Kahoano as Rob
 Justin Loeb as Guy Running From Supergator
 Dave Ruskjer as Max
 Joanna Shewfelt as Tracy
 Charles Solomon as Joe
 Charles Solomon Jr. as Joe
 Jennifer Titus as Zoe
 Traci Toguchi as Melinda

Reception

References

External links 
 Brian Clyde - Director
 
 

Syfy original films
Giant monster films
American independent films
American monster movies
2007 horror films
2000s monster movies
Films about crocodilians
Films about dinosaurs
2007 films
Films produced by Roger Corman
American horror television films
Films directed by Brian Clyde
2000s English-language films
2000s American films
2007 independent films